Uğurlu may refer to:

Places
 Uğurlu, Akçakoca
 Uğurlu, Bismil
 Uğurlu, Bucak
 Uğurlu, Gökçeada
 Hasan Uğurlu Dam, on the River Yeşilırmak 23 km south of Çarşamba town
 Suat Uğurlu Dam, 24 km downstream of Hasan Uğurlu Dam on the River Yeşilırmak 13 km south of Çarşamba town

People
 Enes Uğurlu (born 1989), archer from Turkey

Turkish-language surnames